Sutthisan Winitchai Road, commonly referred to as Sutthisan Road (ถนนสุทธิสาร) is a road in form of soi (side-street) in downtown Bangkok and is the name of the neighbourhood that the road runs through.

History & route
This road was built in 1956, its name "Sutthisan Winitchai" in honour of Phra Sutthisan Winitchai (Mali Bunnag), a former civil servant of Ministry of Justice, who the heir consecrated his private land to the authorities to cut the road for public utilities.

However, Sutthisan Road has another name, after  of the road starting point, it will be a section called Inthamara Road (ถนนอินทามระ), which is named after Pol.Lt.Gen. To Inthamara, a former police who devoted his own land to develop streets and alleys into residences of police officers at that time. At present, the name Inthamara has become all 59 sois of Sutthisan Road. In 2017, there was a court decision ordering Bangkok Metropolitan Administration (BMA) to use the name Inthamara Road. Originally in 2004, it was all changed to Sutthisan. The BMA claims that the name Sutthisan is more widely known.

Neighbourhoods
Sutthisan is considered one of the old areas of Bangkok. Nowadays, it is considered a suitable area for living as it is a convenient location. Because it is a shortcut or a connection to the main highway, both Phahon Yothin and Vibhavadi Rangsit Roads. The arrival of Saphan Khwai Station of BTS Skytrain in 1999 and Sutthisan Station of MRT Blue Line in 2004 increased the area's high land value. Especially on Phahon Yothin or Saphan Khwai side, where many condominiums are located.

See also
List of neighbourhoods in Bangkok

References

Streets in Bangkok
Neighbourhoods of Bangkok
Transport infrastructure completed in 1956
1956 establishments in Thailand